Federal Government Girls' College, Calabar is a federal government-owned all girls school located in Calabar, a town and local government area of Cross River State, Southern Nigeria. The institution was established in 1973 with the vision to be a centre for excellence for the girl child through the provision of opportunities for students to develop their full, all-around potential through a rich academic programme combined with a variety of co-curricular activities.

The school is a co-educational boarding and day school for children aged from 11 to 18 years. In line with the diktats of the National Policy of Education, the college teaches the Nigerian Curriculum for Junior and Senior Secondary Schools.

Past principals
 Miss W. Mary Remmington (January 1974 - August 1977)
 Miss H.J Park (September 1977 - August 1978)
 Mrs. B.C. Etuk
 Mrs. Affiong M.B. Abasiatai
 Barr. Chief Mrs. Eno Okon Bassey (1986 - 1995)
 Barr. Mrs J. K. Ukah (1995 - 2001)
 Lady I.J. Udoh (February 2001 - August 2007)
 Lady Victoria Felix Nsemo (2008 - 2011)

Notable alumni
Kate Henshaw
Wofai Samuel
 Mbong Amata
 Omari Beatrice Gbulgbu
 Regina Askia
 Emem Isong
 Nkechi Okocha

References

External links
 Official website

Schools in Nigeria
1973 establishments in Nigeria
Educational institutions established in 1973